The powerlifting events at the 2001 World Games in Akita was played between 20 and 21 August. 66 athletes, from 15 nations, participated in the tournament. The powerlifting competition took place at Akita City Culture Hall.

Participating nations

Medal table

Events

Men's events

Women's events

References

External links
 International Powerlifting Federation
 Powerlifting on IWGA website
 Results

 
2001 World Games
2001